The Amnaș is a right tributary of the river Apold in Romania. It flows into the Apold in Apoldu de Jos.

References

Rivers of Romania
Rivers of Sibiu County